Barthout van Assendelft (born around 1440 - died after 1502) was a Dutch Grand Pensionary.

Biography
The origins of Barthout van Assendelft are unclear. He might have been related to Barthout van Assendelft Willemsz, Lord of Vlieland and Veenhuizen, steward of Philip the Good and alderman of Haarlem, who was married to Yde van Swieten.

Barthout van Assendelft studied at the Old University of Leuven (1453) and at the University of Paris (1455-1456). He obtained his doctorate in law from the University of Ferrara (Italy) in 1462. He was the city attorney of Leiden (1468-1477). From 1480 to 1489 and as a second term from 1494 to 1497 he was state attorney (grand pensionary) of the States of Holland.

Coat of arms 
The coat of arms of the Van Assendelft family consisted of a passant horse in argent on a field of red (in het rood een stappend zilveren paard).

Sources
 Inventaris van het archief van de Ridderschap en Edelen (Dutch)
 Staten van Holland voor 1572 (Dutch; PDF; 1,0 MB)

Literature 
 H. P. Fölting: De landsadvocaten en raadpensionarissen der Staten van Holland en West-Friesland 1480–1795. Een genealogische benadering. In: Jaarboek Centraal Bureau voor Genealogie. Band 27, 1972, S. 294–343.

References 

 
 

Lawyers of the Habsburg Netherlands
Grand Pensionaries
1440 births
16th-century deaths
Year of birth uncertain
Year of death unknown
Old University of Leuven alumni
University of Ferrara alumni
University of Paris alumni
Dutch expatriates in France
Dutch expatriates in Italy